Founded in 1994, Western Academy of Beijing (WAB) is an international school located in Beijing. The school provides education from Early Years 3 to Grade 12. WAB uses the IB PYP (IB Primary Years Program) until Grade 5, IB MYP (IB Middle Years Program) up to and including Grade 10, and the IB DP (IB Diploma Program) for Grades 11 and 12.

WAB was an Olympic Educational Model School for the Beijing 2008 Olympic Games. Out of the 500 schools across China, who were awarded by Beijing Organizing Committee for the Olympic Games as an Olympic Educational Model School, WAB was among the top 120 schools.

In 2013, Mike Embley, the headmaster of the British School of Beijing (BSB), stated that along with BSB and the International School of Beijing (ISB), WAB was one of the top three English-language international schools in Beijing, all having long waiting lists. Citing Embley's definition of two lower tiers of Beijing Anglophone international schools which have vacant student spaces, Tristan Bunnell, the author of The Changing Landscape of International Schooling: Implications for Theory and Practice, stated that this was an instance of the idea of " 'superior' and 'inferior' schools" shared by teachers and parents.

WABX
WABX is WAB's extra-curricular program and offers more than 400 athletic, art, service, academic, and social options to students school-wide. WAB participates in multiple interscholastic sporting competitions, including the ACAMIS (Association of China and Mongolia International Schools), ISAC (International Schools Association in China), Tri-Cities (Beijing, Guangzhou, Shanghai), China Cup, EARCOS, and APAC (Asian Pacific Athletic Conference). Sports include rugby, football (soccer), tennis, badminton, cross country, track and field, volleyball, basketball, swimming, baseball, table tennis, and softball.

Accreditation
WAB is accredited by many associations, such as:
 International Schools Athletic Conference (ISAC)
 The International Baccalaureate (IBO)
 National Center for Curriculum and Textbook Development (NCCT)
 New England Association of Schools and Colleges (NEASC)
 Association of China and Mongolia International Schools (ACAMIS)
 The Council of International Schools (CIS)
East Asia Regional Council of Schools (EARCOS)
 Tri-Cities Association Beijing, Guangzhou, Shanghai (Tri-Cities 北京，广州，上海)
 Asia Pacific Activities Conference (APAC).

References

External links
 Western Academy of Beijing
 WABX - WAB's Extra Curricular Activities

Private schools in China
Educational institutions established in 1994
International Baccalaureate schools in China
Schools in Chaoyang District, Beijing
International schools in Beijing
Association of China and Mongolia International Schools
1994 establishments in China
High schools in Beijing